Google Chrome is a freeware web browser developed by Google LLC. The development process is split into different "release channels", each working on a build in a separate stage of development. Google Chrome provides four channels: Stable, Beta, Dev, and Canary. Chrome is generally updated every three to four weeks for major releases as well as stable builds for minor releases.

Versions 

The following table summarizes the release history for the Google Chrome web browser.

See also 
 Safari version history
 Firefox version history
 History of the Opera web browser
 Internet Explorer version history

Notes 

 Release date is the date of the first release. All channels have subsequent updates which are not shown. For release, update history see Google Chrome Releases.
 Old development and beta builds are not shown after they become stable releases.
 The first stable release in macOS and Linux was Google Chrome 5.0.375. The first stable release on Android was Chrome 18.0.1025123 (Chrome for Android).
 Chrome 21 was the last supported version on Mac OS X 10.5.
 As of Chrome 26, Linux installations of the browser may be updated only on systems that support GCC v4.6 and GTK v2.24 or later. Thus systems such as Ubuntu Lucid 10.04 LTS, Debian 6's 2.20, and RHEL 6's 2.18 are now among those marked as deprecated.
 Chrome 34 was the last supported version to run on older processors that lacked SSE2.
 Chrome 42 was the last version supported on  Android Ice Cream Sandwich
 Chrome 49 released on 2016-03-02 was the last version supported on Windows XP, Windows Vista, Mac OS X 10.6, 10.7, and 10.8.
 As of Chrome 59, Linux Chrome defaults to GTK+3. Older versions of Linux, e.g. RHEL 6 or CentOS 6, with only GTK+2 support, are not able to run this version of Chrome. Red Hat's GTK+2 build of Firefox ESR is probably the last remaining regularly updated browser on RHEL 6/CentOS 6.
 Standalone builds can be found on Google's Chromium Browser Continuous build server.
 Chrome 67 was the last version supported on OS X 10.9, however, Google's download page offers version 65.
 Chrome 71 was the last version supported on  Android Jelly Bean
 Chrome 81 was the last version supported on Android KitKat.
 Version 82 was skipped due to the COVID-19 pandemic.
 Chrome 87 was the last version supported on OS X 10.10.
 Chrome 88 was the last supported version to run on older processors that lacked SSE3.
 Chrome 95 was the last version supported on Android Lollipop.
 Chrome 103 was the last version supported on OS X 10.11 and macOS 10.12.
 Chrome 106 was the last version supported on Android Marshmallow.
 Chrome 109 was the last version supported on Windows 7, Windows 8 and Windows 8.1.

References

External links 
 User agent strings for different versions of Chrome. Archived copy.

Google Chrome
Software version histories
History of web browsers